Shchepkin is a rural locality (a khutor) in Lipovskoye Rural Settlement, Olkhovsky District, Volgograd Oblast, Russia. The population was 19 as of 2010.

Geography 
Shchepkin is located in steppe, on the Volga Upland, on the left bank of the Golaya River, 5 km south of Olkhovka (the district's administrative centre) by road. Zenzevatka is the nearest rural locality.

References 

Rural localities in Olkhovsky District